LSS Data Systems (LSS), was a Minnesota-based medical software and service company that develops products for physicians. LSS was founded in 1982, and since then was a partner of Medical Information Technology (MEDITECH), developing physician practice management and ambulatory electronic health record software. In 2000 and 2001 MEDITECH invested in LSS and in February 2011, acquired complete ownership. LSS became a wholly owned subsidiary of the Massachusetts based company, and announced completion of the merger on January 1, 2014.

History
"Lake Superior Software" was founded in 1982 in Duluth, Minnesota by Ken Carlson and Stephanie Petersen, to develop and support physician billing and practice management software. The company developed a national clientele, opened an office just outside Minneapolis in the mid-1980s, and changed its name to "LSS Data Systems." Beginning in 1990, the company’s physician practice management system was redeveloped and re-written utilizing a newer programming language called MAGIC first developed by MEDITECH.

LSS began development of additional applications in 1996, complementing its practice management system with an ambulatory electronic medical record. In 2000, both the practice management product and ambulatory EMR were incorporated into a suite of applications for physician practices co-developed with MEDITECH called the Medical and Practice Management (MPM) Suite. In addition to LSS's physician billing and practice management application (PBR) and Electronic Ambulatory Record (EAR), the suite meshes together applications jointly developed with MEDITECH, including scheduling, order management, scanning and a web-based patient portal.

Joanne Wood was appointed as president and COO of LSS Data Systems in February 2011 during the company's acquisition.  She was also VP of client services at MEDITECH, at that time.

Products and services
LSS developed electronic medical software for physician practices associated with or located in communities with hospitals using Meditech health care information systems.
Several LSS products have been certified by the Certification Commission for Healthcare Information Technology (CCHIT).

2008 Certification [additionally certified for Child Health] pending completion of advanced ePrescribing requirements: Medical and Practice Management Suite, Client Server Version 5.6
2007 Certification: http://www.cchit.org/products/2007/ambulatory/661 Medical and Practice Management Suite, Client Server Version 5.56]
2007 Certification: Medical and Practice Management Suite, Client Server Version 5.55
2007 Certification: Medical and Practice Management Suite, Client Server Version 5.54
2006 Certification: Medical and Practice Management Suite, MAGIC Version 5.6

LSS since certified products to be compliant with the Stage 1 Meaningful Use Standards identified by the Office of the National Coordinator for Health Information Technology with Drummond Group Inc. (see certified product info below). It has other electronic health record (EHR) products.

LSS & MEDITECH Integration
As a Meditech company, LSS develops its software using the same programming tools and technologies as Meditech, forming an integrated suite of products for health care organizations. The use of shared tools and system conventions with Meditech makes the user interface similar and consistent for clinicians in multiple care settings. LSS began programming software using Meditech proprietary language known as MAGIC (not to be confused with a different PC database product of the same name).

References

Companies based in Eden Prairie, Minnesota
Software companies established in 1982
Software companies based in Minnesota
Electronic health record software companies
1982 establishments in Minnesota
Defunct software companies of the United States